Eucharitolus geometricus is a species of longhorn beetles of the subfamily Lamiinae. It was described by Tippmann in 1960, and is known from Bolivia.

References

Beetles described in 1960
Endemic fauna of Bolivia
Acanthocinini